Woodbrook College is an Edmund Rice, co-educational secondary school located in Woodbrook, Bray, Dún Laoghaire–Rathdown, Ireland. 

The grounds are located on the Dublin Road, just north of Bray. Although, officially, it is over the County Dublin border, it usually referred to as being in County Wicklow and part of Bray. The former building was opened on 5 September 1956, and accommodated approximately 400 students.

The school celebrated its fiftieth year in 2006, thus marking its Golden Jubilee. This led to a presidential visit.

Subjects 
Woodbrook College offers a range of subjects, both optional and core. Out of the four optional subjects offered for the Junior Cycle, a maximum of two can be taken. Out of the twelve optional subjects for the Senior Cycle, a maximum of four can be taken.

Extracurricular activities 
Woodbrook College offers students many extracurricular activities. Among them are basketball, supervised study, rugby, Gaelic games, association football (soccer), athletics and  debating.

Notable alumni 
 Fergal Devitt - professional wrestler

References

External links 

Woodbrookcollege.ie

Educational institutions established in 1956
Education in Bray, County Wicklow
Secondary schools in County Wicklow
1956 establishments in Ireland